Pennywell is one of the UK's largest post-war social housing schemes, and is situated in the central-west area of Sunderland, Tyne and Wear, North East England. Pennywell is the largest local authority housing estate in the City of Sunderland. The estate mostly built during the late 1940s and early 1950s to replace 19th century slums in the centre of Sunderland.  The name Pennywell is of Celtic origin and is thought to mean "wellspring at the top of the hill".

The Pennywell estate consists of nearly 3,000 homes, around 11% of which are privately owned and has a total population of 10,709  This figure is considerably lower than in previous decades, when the Pennywell area housed over 20,000 people. An industrial area on the western edge of the suburb has, among other businesses Calsonic's injection moulding plant and the Sunderland Echo building.

Crime
Pennywell has traditionally been associated with high crime rates since the estate was completed in 1953. Knife crime and anti-social behaviour have been a growing problem since the 1990s.

The estate was the scene of a murder when 22-year-old Kevin Johnson was fatally stabbed outside his house on Patrick Road in the early hours of 19 May 2007. Three teenagers were convicted of the murder six months later and sentenced to life imprisonment. At the trial, it was revealed that after stabbing Kevin Johnson, the three defendants had gone on to attack another man in the area and also damaged two cars. Mr Johnson's family later had two applications for criminal injuries compensation rejected on the basis that he had contributed to his own death by leaving the safety of his home to confront the teenagers about their noisy behaviour. A third application for compensation was successful and the Johnson family received £5,500 from a scheme which could already pay a maximum of £500,000 to claimants.

In April 1994, The Independent newspaper condemned Pennywell as a "no go area" and one of the worst places in Britain, highlighting an unemployment rate as 19% (around twice the national average) and that attacks on police and vandalism of police vehicles were a frequent occurrence in the area.

As a result of these events, the Gentoo Group are undertaking a massive programme of renewal and regeneration for the area which will provide a high standard of modern housing for social housing tenants and homeowners alike.  The first phases of this plan, at Waterford Green, are nearing completion.

Education
Pennywell Comprehensive School was built in 1967 and remained open until 2008. It was finally demolished in 2009 and replaced with a new facility on the same site – Academy 360. Pupils attending the comprehensive school were members of one of four houses - Stratford (green), Harwell (blue), Everest (yellow) and Runnymede (red). The school boasted excellent sporting facilities including several full size football/rugby pitches, an all-weather athletics track, a fully equipped sports hall (incorporating five-a-side pitches, basketball/netball courts & cricket nets), fully equipped indoor gymnasium with balance beams/climbing ropes/trampoline harnesses, outdoor cricket pitches, tennis courts and several tarmac yard areas with basketball courts.
Classrooms were predominantly located in four five-storey tower blocks (B, C, D & E blocks) and included science laboratories, art studios, home economics kitchens and IT suites. The new school (Academy 360) has four houses, Amity, Loftus, Torrens and Adelaide. These houses were named after ships that had been built within Sunderland.

References

City of Sunderland suburbs
Sunderland